Chick Musson (8 October 1920 – 1955) was an English professional footballer who played as a wing half.

Career
Born in Kilburn, Musson played non-league football for Holbrook St. Michael's, before spending eight seasons in the Football League with Derby County, where he made 246 appearances.

References

1920 births
1955 deaths
English footballers
Derby County F.C. players
English Football League players
English Football League representative players
Association football wing halves
FA Cup Final players